Seal Beach is an EP by The Album Leaf. It was originally released in Spain in 2003 on Acuarela Discos, and was re-released in 2005 in America by Better Looking Records with five bonus live tracks.

Original track listing
Malmo
Brennivin
Seal Beach
Christiansands
One Minute

Re-release track listing
Malmo
Brennivin
Seal Beach
For Jonathan
One Minute
Last Time Here (Live)
Wet The Day (Live)
Essex (Live)
The MP (Live)
Storyboard (Live)

Vinyl Release
On March 21, 2015, Jimmy LaValle's own Eastern Glow Recordings released the Seal Beach EP on Vinyl.

References

2003 EPs
The Album Leaf albums